Robert James (born July 7, 1947) is a former American football defensive back who played six seasons from 1969 to 1974 for the Buffalo Bills in the National Football League (NFL). James was a three-time Pro Bowler, in 1972, 1973 and 1974. He ran track for Fisk University in Tennessee.

References

External links
 Stats

1947 births
Living people
American football cornerbacks
Buffalo Bills players
Fisk University alumni
American Conference Pro Bowl players
College men's track and field athletes in the United States
People from Murfreesboro, Tennessee
Players of American football from Tennessee